Adrià Muñoz Fernández (born 13 May 1994), simply known as Adrià, is a Spanish footballer who plays as a goalkeeper for FC Mulhouse.

Club career
Born in Girona, Catalonia, Adrià finished his graduation with UE Llagostera. He made his debut as a senior with the reserves in 2013, in the regional leagues.

On 7 June 2015, Adrià made his professional debut, coming on as a late substitute for injured José Moragón in a 4–2 away win against Real Valladolid in the Segunda División championship.

In July 2016 Adrià signed for Brighton based English National League South side Whitehawk, was released in November 2016 but played on a non-contract basis in the FA Trophy against Weymouth the following month when both other first team goalkeepers were unavailable.

On 31 December 2016 he was given his Lewes debut against Three Bridges.

References

External links

1994 births
Living people
Sportspeople from Girona
Spanish footballers
Footballers from Catalonia
Association football goalkeepers
Segunda División players
UE Costa Brava players
National League (English football) players
Whitehawk F.C. players
Spanish expatriate footballers
Spanish expatriate sportspeople in England
Expatriate footballers in England